ATN is the Sydney flagship television station of the Seven Network in Australia. The licence, issued to a company named Amalgamated Television Services, a subsidiary of John Fairfax & Sons, was one of the first four licences (two in Sydney, two in Melbourne) to be issued for commercial television stations in Australia. It began broadcasting on 2 December 1956.

The station formed an affiliation with GTV-9 Melbourne in 1957, in order to share content. In 1963, Frank Packer ended up owning both GTV-9 and TCN-9, so as a result the stations switched their previous affiliations. ATN-7 and HSV-7 joined to create the Australian Television Network, which later became the Seven Network. ATN-7 is the home of the national level Seven News bulletins.

The studios and transmission tower
The station opened in 1956 with principal offices and studios located at Mobbs Lane, Epping. The initial black and white cameras and other equipment was supplied by the Marconi Company of England. Conversion to PAL colour occurred on 1 March 1975. Digital DVB-T commenced on 1 January 2001.

The initial transmission tower in 1956 was located near the ABC tower at Gore Hill, Sydney. This was eventually demolished after ATN was invited to share a new site at Artarmon which was built by a new 3rd, commercial broadcaster TEN-10.

Digital and analog broadcasts
ATN-7 commenced digital television transmissions on 1 January 2001, broadcasting on VHF Channel 6 while maintaining analogue transmission on VHF Channel 7.

ATN-7's Sydney transmissions – both DVB-T terrestrial digital PAL – are broadcast from masts operated by Transmitters Australia (TXA) at Artarmon and/or Willoughby. Retransmission translators to UHF channels service Sydney viewers from Kings Cross and North Head at Manly and north of Sydney at Bouddi, Gosford and Forresters Beach (see the Digital Broadcast Australia) web site.

Beginning in the early 2000s, on-air programs were sent by digital link from the Seven Network's national program play-out centre at Docklands in Melbourne where the Master Control Room was located for all metropolitan and regional feeds to be controlled. Programming line-up, advertisement output, feed switching, time zone monitoring and national transmission output was previously delivered here. All Seven Network owned and operated studios used to have their live signals relayed here: for instance, ATN's output was fed to HSV and then transmitted via satellite or fibre optics to the towers around metropolitan Sydney. In 2019 however, this function was transferred to a new play-out centre in Sydney as part of a joint venture with the Nine Network.

The analogue signal for ATN-7 was turned off at 9:00 am on 3 December 2013 by using a special five-minute retrospective clip of the local station and the song "My City of Sydney" by Tommy Leonetti, used for the first time in 30 years, combined with the old "Mother kangaroo putting her baby joey to bed" animation, which was played during the channel closedown sequence until the network began 24-hour service in 1993.

Program production
The Epping facilities were expanded to provide five operational studios and the centre became the largest producer of Australian produced TV content, including Wheel of Fortune,  Sons and Daughters, A Country Practice, Hey Dad..!, All Saints, Terry Willesee Tonight and Home & Away.

The Epping studios closed in early 2010 when new studio facilities serviced by Global Television, opened at the Australian Technology Park in Eveleigh.

News and live telecast programs are presently broadcast from the Martin Place studios.

RaceCam
ATN's engineering staff received two Emmy Awards – making ATN the first Australian company to receive such an award – for the technology, invention and further development of RaceCam, live mobile point-of-view TV cameras which were initially developed in the late 1970s and early 1980s for the station's coverage of the Bathurst 1000. Visiting commentators from the United States organised for ATN staff to supply the camera and transmission systems for CBS' coverage of NASCAR races.

A variant of RaceCam was also developed for yachts in the 1987 America's Cup off the coast of Fremantle. Later in the mid-1980s, the American Broadcasting Company asked ATN staff to develop aerofoil-designed cameras suitable for Formula One cars, and these were subsequently used at the Indianapolis 500.

Seven’s Martin Place Studios

The Seven Network's Martin Place studios, referred to on-air as News Central and based on the first five floors of The Colonial Building in Sydney are the main news presentation studios for, Seven News Sydney, Sunrise, Weekend Sunrise, and The Morning Show. Comprising 3,000 square metres, viewers and tourists can see programs being broadcast from the street level studio. The network claims that the Martin Place facilities are one of the most technologically advanced digital television centres in the world.

Eliminations for the fifth season of The Mole in 2005 were also held at the Martin Place studios; the set was configured for each elimination episode including the final episode in which the winner and the Mole were revealed live. This meant that guests could watch outside the studio as the eliminations were being carried out live. Notable guests included contestants from previous seasons.

In March 2021, it was announced that the Seven Network would move out of Martin Place to Eveleigh by the end of 2022 after almost two decades. The decision is understood to be a cost-saving move away from CBD property leasing.

Seven News

7NEWS Sydney is presented by Mark Ferguson from Sunday to Thursday and Michael Usher and Angela Cox on  Friday and Saturday from the Martin Place studios. Sport is presented by Mel McLaughlin from Sunday to Thursday and Matt Shirvington on Friday and Saturday. Weather is presented by Angie Asimus from Sunday to Thursday and Sally Bowrey on Friday and Saturday.

News updates for Sydney are presented throughout the afternoon and the early evenings, with news updates during the night being shown nationally, they can be seen on Seven, 7two and 7mate, as well as 7flix.

At the end of 2003, a year before all of Channel 7's News and Current Affairs moved to Martin Place, the ill-fated dual presenter format of Ross Symonds and Ann Sanders came to an end after the pair failed to make an ratings impact in the Sydney market, losing viewers to competition winner Nine News Sydney (then National Nine News), which had led in the ratings for decades. After Ian Ross took over from both Symonds and Sanders in 2003, Seven News Sydney became the 6pm ratings leader from February 2005 until 2010.

Ross presented his final bulletin for Seven News Sydney on Friday 27 November 2009 with Bath taking over as main weeknight presenter on Monday 30 November 2009. Former Nine News presenter Mark Ferguson took over from Bath as weekend news presenter from Saturday 28 November 2009. The bulletin retained its ratings lead until it was overtaken again by the rival Nine News bulletin in the ratings in 2011 – Seven's 6pm bulletin won 14 out of 35 ratings weeks.

In January 2014, Mark Ferguson was appointed weeknight presenter, replacing Chris Bath due to poor ratings. Bath became weekend presenter and continued to host Sunday Night until her resignation in July 2015, after which Melissa Doyle took over. More changes to Sydney's news presenting team in subsequent months saw former Melbourne weather presenter David Brown replace Sarah Cumming as Sydney's weather presenter and Mel McLaughlin replace Jim Wilson as the sports presenter.

In August 2016, it was announced that Michael Usher would replace Melissa Doyle as Friday and Saturday presenter. Doyle will move into a new expanded role as senior correspondent and host of Sunday Night.

For its efforts in bringing news of the 2014 Sydney hostage crisis to the whole of Australia (ATN's Martin Place news rooms and facilities were evacuated and news operations shifted to a makeshift studio miles from the site, with additional coverage from other stations nationwide), Seven News Sydney became the 2015 Logie Awards winner for Most Outstanding News Coverage.

In June 2020, Jim Wilson left Seven after 28 years with the network, to become a new host of 2GB's Drive program. His last sports bulletin was 27 June 2020. It was later announced that Matt Shirvington will replace him.

On 5 November 2020, David Brown left the Sydney newsroom to return to Melbourne with Angie Asimus promoted to weeknights weather presenter.

In December 2020, it was announced Angela Cox would be joining Michael Usher as co-host of the weekend news bulletin from January 2021.

Presenters

Afternoon news updates
 Ann Sanders (until 2:00 pm on Monday – Thursday)
 Sally Bowrey (until 2:00 pm on Friday)
 Mark Ferguson (after 3:00 pm on Monday – Thursday, after 4:00 pm on Sunday)
 Michael Usher (after 3:00 pm on Friday, after 4:00 pm on Saturday)

Nightly news updates
 Mark Ferguson (until 7:30 pm on Sunday – Thursday)
 Michael Usher (after 8:30 pm on weeknights and Saturday)

Reporters

 Chris Reason (Senior)
 Mark Riley (Canberra Political Editor)
 Ashlee Mullany (US Bureau)
 Robert Ovadia (Crime)
 Paul Kadak
 Chris Maher
 Andrew Denney (Crime)
 Laura Banks (Crime)
 Tom Sacre
 Sarina Andaloro
 Tom Hartley

 Amelia Brace
 Hugh Whitfeld (Europe Bureau Chief)
 Alex Hart (State Political Reporter)
 Angie Asimus
 Matt Carmichael (Sport)
 David Woiwod (US Correspondent)
 Tim Lester (US Correspondent)
 Amber Laidler
 Isabelle Mullen
 Sarah Greenhalgh (Europe Correspondent)
 Leonie Ryan (Court Reporter)

Fill-In Presenters

News
 Chris Reason
 Angela Cox

Sport
 Matt Carmichael
 Michelle Bishop

Weather
 Angie Asimus

Sunrise/Weekend Sunrise correspondent
 Mylee Hogan

The Latest: Seven News correspondent
 Tom Sacre

Programmes produced by ATN-7

Martin Place
Seven Early News
Sunrise
The Morning Show
The Morning Show: Weekend
Weekend Sunrise
Seven Morning News
Seven News at 4
Seven News Sydney
The Latest: Seven News
 Test Cricket coverage (2018–present)
 Women's Big Bash League coverage (2018–present)
 Big Bash League coverage (2018–present)
 Rugby League World Cup coverage (2013, 2017)
 Olympic Games coverage (1992–present)

Current productions at Australian Technology Park
Home & Away (1988–present)
My Kitchen Rules (2010–present)
The Chase Australia (2021–present)

Filmed at FOX Studios
The X Factor (2010–2016)

On Location
Better Homes and Gardens (1995–present)
Sydney Weekender (1994–present)
House Rules (2013–2019)
Carols in the Domain (1982–present)
Farmer Wants a Wife (2020–present)
Schools Spectacular (2016–2019, 2021)
Schools Spectacular Remixed (2020)

Past Programming
Sunday Night (2009–2019)
V8 Supercars (2007–2014, 2021–present)
Packed to the Rafters (2008–2013)
Today Tonight (ATN-7 1995–2001) (HSV-7 2001–2006) (ATN-7 2007–2012) (HSV-7 2013–2014) 
11AM (1975–1999)
Newsworld (1982–1989)
Real Life (1992–1994, became Today Tonight from 1995)
The Price Is Right (2012)
The NightCap (2008) 
Wild Boys (2011)
All Saints (1998–2009)
Always Greener (2001–2003)
Hey Dad..! (1987–1994)
Sons and Daughters (1982–1987)
A Country Practice (1981–1993)
Wheel of Fortune (ADS-7 1981–1987) (SAS-7 1987–1996) (ATN-7 1996–2006)
Denton (1994–1995)
Who Dares Wins (1996–2000)
The Real Seachange (2006)
The Zoo (2007–2008)
Saturday Disney (1997–2016)
Playhouse Disney (2003–2007)
The Big Arvo (2001–2005)
Surf Patrol
It's Academic (2005–2016)
headLand (2005–2006)
Popstars Live (2000–2002, 2004)
Surprise Chef (2001–2003)
The Daily Edition (2013–2020)
Andrew Denton's Interview (2018–2019)
The Dream with Roy and HG (2000, 2004)
The Ice Dream with Roy and HG (2002)
Win Roy & H.G.'s Money (2000)
The Monday Dump (2001–2002)
The Nation Dumps (2002)
The Cream (2003)
The Matty Johns Show (2010)
Sportsworld (HSV-7 1987–2003) (ATN-7 2004–2006)
The Mole (2005)
Sunday Sunrise (1997–2004, 2005)
Between Two Worlds (2020)
Plate of Origin (2020)
The Secret Daughter (2016–2017)
Secret Bridesmaids' Business (2019)

Early efforts by the station included variety series Sydney Tonight (1956–1959), Captain Fortune Show (1956–1960) for children, soap opera Autumn Affair (1958–1959) and talent program TV Talent Scout (1957–1958).

See also

 Television broadcasting in Australia
 Circle 7 logo

External links
 Official Site

References

Television stations in New South Wales
Television stations in Sydney
Seven Network
Television channels and stations established in 1956
1956 establishments in Australia